War depictions in film and television include documentaries, TV mini-series, and drama serials depicting aspects of historical wars. The films included here are films set in the time period from 2001 to present day, or from the moment the world woke up to a new reality one September morning at the dawn of a new century, the 9/11 attacks were followed by the War on Terrorism, which has now lasted for about two decades. But it's worth noting that the early period of 21st century hasn't only seen the war on terror, but wars that have followed in the aftermath of the Arab Spring.

Note: Various wars on here are still ongoing in one form or another.

War on Terrorism (2001–present)

September 11 attacks (2001) 

 11'09"01 September 11 (2002)
 DC 9/11: Time of Crisis (2003) (TV)
 Ash Tuesday (2003)
 September (2003 film)
 Rudy: The Rudy Giuliani Story
 Yasmin (2004)
 Fahrenheit 9/11 (2004) (documentary)
 FahrenHYPE 9/11 (2004) (documentary)
 Hamburg Cell (2004) (TV)
 Homeland Security (2004)
 Tiger Cruise (2004) (TV)
 WTC View (2005)
 The Flight That Fought Back (2005)
 Into the Fire (2005)
 Flight 93 (film) (2006)
 A Few Days in September (2006)
 The 9/11 Commission Report (2006)
 The Path to 9/11 (2006) (TV)
 United 93 (2006)
 A Broken Sole (2006)
 World Trade Center (2006)
 9/11: The Twin Towers Brick Lane (2007)
 Liberty Kid (2007)
 Kurbaan (2009)
 The Space Between Remember Me (2010 film) My Name Is Khan Extremely Loud and Incredibly Close (2012)
 Zero Dark Thirty (2012)
 The Reluctant Fundamentalist (film) (2012)
 Jack Ryan: Shadow Recruit (2014)
 9/11 (2017)
 12 Strong (2018)
 Vice (2018)
 The Looming Tower (2018)
 Windows on the World (2019)
 The Report (2019)

 War in Afghanistan (2001–2021) 

 Kandahar (2001)
 Osama (2003)
 Fire Over Afghanistan (2003)
 September Tapes (2004)
 Brødre (2004)
 Lions for Lambs (2007)
 Where in the World Is Osama Bin Laden? (2008), documentary
 Iron Man (2008)
 The Objective (2008)
 Red Sands (2009)
 Brothers (2009)
 Restrepo (2010) Oscar Nominee
 Armadillo (2010)
 Combat Hospital (TV series)
 My Name is Khan (2010)
 Essential Killing (2010)
 Dear John (2010)
 Hell and Back Again (2011) Oscar Nominee
 Afghan Luke (2011)
 Young Soldiers (2011) (TV series)
 Our War (2011–2014) (TV series), documentary about British soldiers first-hand experience of the war in Afghanistan
 Forces spéciales (2011)
 Hooligans At War (2011)
 Zero Dark Thirty (2012)
 Deutschland is a good country (2012) (documentary) more on 
 Bluestone 42 (2013) (TV series)
 The Patrol (2013)
 Vishwaroopam (2013)
 Lone Survivor (2013) Based on Marcus Luttrell's book Lone Survivor Korengal (2014) documentary on soldiers' experiences of war in the Korengal Valley of Afghanistan.
 Kajaki (2014)
 Inbetween Worlds (2014) (Zwischen Welten) Screened in main competition 64th Berlin Film Festival.
 Hyena Road (2015)
 Krigen (2015)
 Sniper Special Ops (2016)
 Taking Fire (2016)
 SIX (2017–2018)
 War Machine (2017)
 12 Strong (2018)
 The Outpost (2020)
 Retrograde (2022)

 Iraq War (2003–2011) 

 Saving Jessica Lynch (2003) (TV)
 Ghayr Saleh (Under Exposure, alternative title: Invalid) (2004)
 Gunner Palace (2004), documentary
 The Dreams of Sparrows (2005), documentary
 Occupation: Dreamland (2005), documentary
 Over There (2005) (TV series)
 The Tiger and the Snow (2005)
 American Soldiers (2005)
 Baghdad ER (2006), documentary
 Djihad (2006) (TV)
 Dreams (2006)
 Home of the Brave (2006)
 Iraq in Fragments (2006)
 My Country, My Country (2006)
 The Situation (2006)
 Valley of the Wolves Iraq (2006)
 The War Tapes (2006), documentary
 In the Valley of Elah (2007)
 Body of War (2007), documentary
 Nassiryia – Per non dimenticare (2007) (TV series)
 No End In Sight (2007), documentary
 Redacted (2007)
 Grace Is Gone (2007)
 The Mark of Cain (2007) (TV)
 Battle For Haditha (2007)
 The Four Horsemen (2007)
 Stop Loss (2008)
 W. (2008)
 House of Saddam (2008) (TV)
 Generation Kill (2008) (TV series)
 Body of Lies (2008)
 10 Days to War (2008)
 Time Bomb (2008)
 Standard Operating Procedure (2008), documentary
 A Line in the Sand (2009)
 Brothers at War (2009), documentary
 Taking Chance (2009)
 The Hurt Locker (2009)
 The Messenger (2009)
 The Road to Fallujah (2009), documentary
 The Triangle of Death (2009), documentary
 Occupation (TV series) (2009)
 Baker Boys: Inside the Surge (2010) (miniseries)
 Fair Game (2010)
 Farewell Baghdad (2010)
 Green Zone (2010)
 Shadows in Paradise (2010)
 Son of Babylon (2010)
 No True Glory: Battle for Fallujah (2011)
 Homeland (TV series) (2011)
 Memorial Day (2012)
 Allegiance (2012)
 Boys of Abu Ghraib (2014)
 American Sniper (2014)
 War Dogs (2016)
 Billy Lynn's Long Halftime Walk (film)(2016)
 Sand Castle (2017)
 The Wall (2017)
 The Long Road Home (2017)
 The Yellow Birds (2017)
 Indivisible (2018)
 Once Upon a Time in Iraq (2020), BBC documentary

 Covert special operations in Afghanistan, Iraq, Somalia etc. 

 The Unit (2006–2009) (TV series)
 Body of Lies (2008)
 Forces spéciales (2011)
 Soldiers of Fortune (2012)
 Vishwaroopam (2013)
 Good Kill (2014)
 Eye in the Sky (2015)
 Mine (2016)
 SEAL Team (2017–Present) Insurgency in Saudi Arabia (2003–present) 
 Syriana (2005)
 The Kingdom (2007)

 Insurgency in the Maghreb (2002–present) 
 Rendition (2007)

 Joint Chiefs of Staff operations 
 E-Ring (2005–2006) (TV series)

 Operation Enduring Freedom – Philippines (2002–2015) 
 Operation Balikatan (2003)
 The Hunt for Eagle One (2006)
 The Hunt for Eagle One: Crash Point (2006)
 Act of Valor (2012)
 Whiskey Tango Foxtrot (2016)

 Terrorist Sleeper cells 
 The Siege (1998)
 Sleeper Cell (miniseries) (2005–2006)
 Traitor (2008)
 Vantage Point (2008)
 Four Lions (2010)
 Patriots Day (2016)
 Hotel Mumbai (2018)

 War on Terror in Pakistan 

 A Mighty Heart (2007)
 Forces spéciales (2011)
 Seal Team Six: The Raid on Osama Bin Laden (2012) (TV)
 Waar (2012)
 Zero Dark Thirty (2012)
 Phantom (2015)

 Modern wars in sub-Saharan Africa (2003–present) 
 War in Darfur (2003–present) 
 The Devil Came on Horseback (2007)
 Darfur Diaries: Message from Home (2006), documentary
 Google Darfur (2007), documentary
 On Our Watch (2007), documentary
 Darfur (2009)

 Central African Republic Bush War (2003–2012) 
 The Ambassador (2011), documentary

 Kivu conflict (2004–2013) 
 Blood Coltan (2008), documentary
 Sniper: Reloaded (2011)
 Kony, M23, and the Real Rebels of Congo (2012), VICE News documentary
 War Witch (2012)

 Chadian Civil War (2005–10) 
 Daratt (2006)
 A Screaming Man (2010)

 Central African Republic conflict (2012–present) 
 The Devil Tried to Divide Us (2014), VICE News documentary

 Tuareg rebellion (2012) 
 Timbuktu (2014)

 South Sudanese Civil War (2013–2015) 
 Saving South Sudan (2014), VICE News documentary

 2004 unrest in Kosovo 
 UNMIK Titanik (2004), documentary
 Kosovo: Can You Imagine? (2009), documentary
 Enclave (2015)
 Darkling (2022)

 Mexican Drug War (2006–present) 

 Breaking Bad (TV series) (2008–2013)
 El Sicario, Room 164 (2010), A documentary about an anonymous Ciudad Juárez Sicario known to have killed hundreds
 Miss Bala (2011), A beauty contestant is kidnapped by a cartel and forced to do drug missions in wartorn Mexico
 Savages (2012), Small-time pot growers search for their lover, kidnapped by a cartel they refused to work with
 Snitch (2012), His son arrested, a concerned father makes a deal with a US attorney to infiltrate a Mexican cartel and ends up trapped in a war zone
 End of Watch (2012), The Sinaloa Cartel declares war on 2 LAPD officers arrest who raid a safe house
 The Last Stand (2013), A border-town Sheriff's Department takes on a powerful drug lord and his private army
 The Mexican Mormon War (2012), Vice documentary on the Mormon vigilante militia fighting a drug cartel in Chihuahua
 Narco Cultura (2013), A documentary film that explores the cultural glorification of modern drug traffickers
 El Velador/The Night Watchman (2013), A documentary portraying the quieter, less obvious impact of the drug war
 600 Miles (2015)
 Cartel Land (2015), documentary
 Metástasis (TV series) (2015)
 Sicario (2015), An idealistic FBI agent is enlisted by an elected government task force to aid in the escalating war against drugs at the border area between the U.S. and Mexico
 Sicario: Day of the Soldado (2018), A sequel to 2015's Sicario. The story relates to the drug war at the U.S.-Mexico border and an attempt by the United States government to incite increased conflict among the cartels.
 Narcos: Mexico (2018–present), It focuses on the illegal drug trade in Mexico.
 Rambo: Last Blood (2019 Film),

 South Ossetia War (2008) 
 Olympus Inferno (2008)
 5 Days of War (2011)
 August Eighth (2012)
 Shindisi (2019)

 2011 Libyan Civil War 
 Benghazi Rising (2011), documentary
 Qaddafi: Our Best Enemy (2011), documentary
 First to Fall (2014), documentary
 War Story (2014)
 A Private War (2018)

 Factional violence in Libya (2011–2014) 
 13 Hours: The Secret Soldiers of Benghazi (2016)

 Syrian Civil War (2011–present) 

 Ladder to Damascus (2013)
 Return to Homs (2013), documentary
 ChicagoGirl: The Social Network Takes on a Dictator (2013)
 Ghosts of Aleppo (2014), VICE News documentary
 Rojava: Syria's Unknown War (2014), VICE News documentary
 Sniper: Legacy (2014)
 Her War: Women Vs. ISIS (2015), documentary
 Phantom (2015)
 Dugma: The Button (2016), documentary
 The Father (2016)
 Last Men in Aleppo (2017), documentary
 A Private War (2018)
 Girls of the Sun (2018)
 Spider in the Web (film) (2019)

 Iraqi Civil War (2014–2017) 
 The Road to Mosul (2015), VICE News documentary
 The Road to Fallujah (2016), VICE News documentary
 Reseba (2016)
 Mosul (2019)
Mosul (2020)
 Once Upon a Time in Iraq (2020), BBC documentary

 Russo-Ukrainian War (2014–present) 

 Annexation of Crimea by the Russian Federation (2014) 
 Cherkasy (2020)

 War in Donbas (2014–present) 
 War correspondent ("Военный корреспондент" in Russian) (2014)
 The Guard (2015 TV series) ("Гвардiя" in Ukrainian) (2015), TV series
 Cyborgs: Heroes Never Die (2017)
 Frost (2017)
 Donbass (2018)
 Bad Roads (2020)
 Hotsunlight (2021)
 Klondike (2022)
 Sniper. The White Raven (2022)

 2022 Russian invasion of Ukraine 
 Panorama: Putin's War in Ukraine (2022), documentary
 The Best In Hell (2022) («Лучшие в Аду» in Russian)
 Eastern Front (2023 film) ("Східний фронт" in Ukrainian)

 Yemeni Civil War (2015–present) 
 Yemen's forgotten war (2016), BBC documentary
 Operation Red Sea (2018)
 Al Kameen(The Ambush) (2021)

 2016 Nagorno-Karabakh conflict 
 Gate to Heaven (2019)

 Battle of Marawi (2017) 
 Battle of Marawi (film) (2017), documentary
 Maalaala Mo Kaya: Bandila (2017),
 Maalaala Mo Kaya: Tangke (2018)

 2020–2022 China–India skirmishes 
 Galwan Valley Clash (working title, in pre-production)

 2020 Nagorno-Karabakh war 
 45 Days, The Fight For A Nation'' (2021), documentary

See also 
List of war films and TV specials

References